Hallensteins Glassons is a New Zealand fashion company based in Auckland, with stores in New Zealand and Australia.

Brands

Hallensteins Brothers

Hallenstein Brothers (often shortened to Hallensteins) is a men's fashion, street and lifestyle retailer. It sells a range of men's fashion, clothing, footwear and accessories, ranging from street and lifestyle wear to contemporary formal dress. The company also designs and produces the in-house brands Hallensteins and HBrothers. It has 46 stores across New Zealand and Australia, including 5 in Auckland.

Glassons

Glassons is a women's fashion retailers, selling a range of women's clothing and swimwear. It has 72 stores, including 12 in Auckland.

Ekocycle 

Hallenstein Brothers is a stockist, designer and developer of Ekocycle, a line of environmentally conscious suits crafted by using a blend of recycled materials, sophisticated shapes and refined cuts. The Hallenstein Brothers brand HBrothers, The Coca-Cola Corporation and musician Will.i.am developed the Ekocycle project as an investment in and exploration of the future of international sustainable and environmentally friendly retailing.

In 2015 the HBrothers brand in conjunction with Harrods launched an exclusive new range in further support of the Ekocycle line.

History

Bendix Hallenstein established his first clothing and department store at The Octagon, Dunedin in 1876. By 1900, Hallensteins had 34 stores.

Hallenstein Glasson Holdings Limited which was formed in 1985 through the merger between Hallensteins and Glassons, a fast fashion retailer founded in the early 1900s.

In 2017, Hallensteins had 42 stores.

Hallenstein Brothers has launched several campaigns featuring collaborations between musicians The Script filmed in Cuba  and motorcross rider Carey Hart filmed at the Bonneville Salt Flats. In 2019 the company launched a campaign with model Laura Evans at the forefront, inviting women to wear their skinny fit suits.

During the initial COVID-19 pandemic in New Zealand, Hallensteins Glassons staff received $5.18 million in wage subsidies from the New Zealand Government, with $2.48 million going to staff in Hallenstein Brothers stores. The company posted $28 million in profit in the 2019-20 financial year and paid a dividend to shareholders, but did not repay the subsidy.

References

External links

 
 
 

Clothing retailers of New Zealand
Companies based in Dunedin
New Zealand companies established in 1873
Retail companies established in 1873
Companies based in Auckland